Laflin is a borough in the Greater Pittston area of Luzerne County, Pennsylvania, United States. The population was 1,443 at the time of the 2020 census.

History
Laflin was incorporated as a borough in 1889. It was likely named for one of the owners of the Laflin & Rand Powder Company. The following year, in 1890, the population of the newly formed borough was just over two hundred. Coal mining led to a population boom in the region. 

Laflin witnessed its greatest increase between 1970 and 1980, when the number of residents grew by over 313% (or from 399 people to 1,650 people).

Geography

Demographics

As of the census of 2000, there were 1,502 people, 612 households, and 452 families residing in the borough.

The population density was 1,111.0 people per square mile (429.6/km2). There were 632 housing units at an average density of 467.5 per square mile (180.8/km2).

The racial makeup of the borough was 95.61% White, 0.13% African American, 3.66% Asian, 0.13% from other races, and 0.47% from two or more races. Hispanic or Latino of any race were 0.60% of the population.

There were 612 households, out of which 26.6% had children under the age of eighteen living with them; 62.9% were married couples living together, 9.0% had a female householder with no husband present, and 26.1% were non-families. 24.7% of all households were made up of individuals, and 12.1% had someone living alone who was sixty-five years of age or older.

The average household size was 2.44 and the average family size was 2.90.

In the borough the population was spread out, with 20.5% under the age of eighteen, 4.5% from eighteen to twenty-four, 24.8% from twenty-five to forty-four, 33.4% from forty-five to sixty-four, and 16.8% who were sixty-five years of age or older. The median age was forty-five years.

For every one hundred females there were 88.9 males. For every one hundred females aged eighteen and over, there were 86.9 males.

The median income for a household in the borough was $55,658, and the median income for a family was $69,226. Males had a median income of $50,433 compared with that of $29,375 for females.

The per capita income for the borough was $29,581.

Roughly 1.5% of families and 2.5% of the population were living below the poverty line, including 4.0% of those who were under the age of eighteen and 3.9% of those who were aged sixty-five or over.

Government
The government consists of a mayor and a five-member borough council. The mayor is William C Kennedy, and members of the Borough Council include:
Carl Yastremski, (president), Anthony D'Eliseo, (vice-president), Paul Benderavich, Kyle Costello, and Marc Malvizzi.

Infrastructure
Major highways include Interstate 81 and Route 315.

References

External links

Populated places established in 1889
Boroughs in Luzerne County, Pennsylvania
1889 establishments in Pennsylvania